The 2021 Firestone Grand Prix of St. Petersburg was the second round of the 2021 IndyCar season. The race was held on April 25, 2021, in St. Petersburg, Florida. The race lasted for 100 laps, and was won by Colton Herta.

Background 
The race was originally due to take place on 7 March 2021 as the opening round of the championship, but the COVID-19 pandemic was still a concern for event organisers and IndyCar officials as the 2020 race was postponed from March to October. On January 6 2021, the race was rescheduled to 25 April 2021 so the event can accommodate more fans with loosening restrictions but it was capped to 20,000 fans to attend.

Entry list

Practice

Practice 1
There were 2 red flags during the session, one at the start due to timing and scoring issues, causing the session to be extended by 10 minutes, and another at the end after Sebastien Bourdais spun and stalled his car.

Practice 2

Qualifying

Qualifying classification 

The field was split into two groups of twelve drivers, with the top 6 of each group progressing to the Fast 12. The top 6 of the Fast 12 proceeded to the Firestone Fast 6.

 Notes
 Bold text indicates fastest time set in session.

Warmup

Warmup

Race

Race classification

Championship standings after the race 

Drivers' Championship standings

Engine manufacturer standings

 Note: Only the top five positions are included.

References

External links 

Grand Prix of St. Petersburg
Firestone Grand Prix of St. Petersburg
Firestone Grand Prix of St. Petersburg
21st century in St. Petersburg, Florida
Firestone Grand Prix of St. Petersburg